John Milledge Academy, named after Georgia Governor John Milledge, is a private school located on a  campus on Log Cabin Road in Milledgeville, Georgia, United States. It is coed and nonsectarian, serving students in grades PK-12. Founded in 1971, John Milledge Academy is accredited by the Georgia Accrediting Commission, and is affiliated with Georgia Independent School Association (GISA).

History
John Milledge Academy Inc. was chartered in 1971 and granted tax-exempt status in June of that year.

The campus only included one building, which was overseen by original headmaster Thomas Rasnick. Initially the school's official colors were red, white, and blue, and the mascot was the Patriot. The first school sponsored sport was basketball, and in 1974 the school held its first football game.

In May 2011, Larry S. Prestridge retired as headmaster after 30 years of service to the school, and was replaced by Mark Hopkins. In September 2016, Hopkins resigned as Head of School, being replaced by Jessica Jones and Larry Prestridge.

Notable alumni
Harrison Bryant, football player
J. T. Wall, football player, Milledge AD

References

Educational institutions established in 1971
Schools in Baldwin County, Georgia
Private high schools in Georgia (U.S. state)
Private middle schools in Georgia (U.S. state)
Private elementary schools in Georgia (U.S. state)
Preparatory schools in Georgia (U.S. state)